Jafarbay-e Jonubi Rural District is a rural district (dehestan) in the Central District of Torkaman County, Golestan Province, Iran. At the 2006 census, its population was 18,448, in 3,712 families.  The rural district has 21 villages.

References 

Rural Districts of Golestan Province
Torkaman County